Praia da Adraga is a North Atlantic beach in Portugal, near to the town of Almoçageme, Sintra. It has been recommended in British newspapers. It is a "Blue Flag beach" with access for handicapped persons, It has an excellent restaurant and a very good emergency service system, although it is hard to reach by public transportation.

Because of its beauty it has been the subject of many photographs and many blogs.

Notes

External links
João Domingues Photo - Portuguese Nature and Landscapes
Virtual Portugal/Sintra/Beaches

Beaches of Lisbon District
Sintra